Bankole Cardoso is a Nigerian entrepreneur and co-founder of Easy Taxi Nigeria.

Early life and education
Cardoso was born in Lagos to a banker, Afolabi Emmanuel Cardoso, and a medical doctor, Ameyo Adadevoh. His father belongs to the Amaro community of Lagos, while his mother was a descendant of a long line of prominent Nigerians that began with King Abiodun. He attended Corona School, Ikoyi for his primary school, and Grange Secondary School, both in Lagos, before going to Rugby School in the United Kingdom for his GCSE and A-Levels. Afterwards, he moved to the US for his University education, attending Boston College (BC), to study Accounting and Business Management and graduated in 2010. Cardoso continued his education in the United States earning his MBA from Columbia Business School in 2018.

Career
He moved to New York City to work with Carlyle Group and as an associate at PricewaterhouseCoopers (PWC), where he earned his CPA (Certified Public Accountant) credentials.

Easy Taxi Nigeria
Cardoso started Easy Taxi in Nigeria in 2013 because he wanted a simple way to aid commuting in Lagos. He also mentioned that he hoped to standardize pricing of taxis around the country.
Easy Taxi under his watch grew to be one of the most used taxi hailing apps in Lagos as well as Abuja.
Easy Taxi is a free smartphone application that allows users to request taxis in the easiest way possible. The app uses GPS to connect users to the drivers closest to them and then sends the user the drivers’ information and allows the user to track the driver on the map in real time.
Present in 30 countries, Nigeria was the first country to launch it in Africa and currently has a network of over 400 drivers in Lagos with services extended to Abuja.

Although still affiliated with the company, he stepped down as the CEO in January, 2015

References

Living people
Businesspeople from Lagos
21st-century Nigerian businesspeople
Yoruba businesspeople
Carroll School of Management alumni
Abiodun family
Nigerian expatriates in the United States
Nigerian technology businesspeople
1980s births
People educated at Rugby School
Nigerian expatriates in the United Kingdom
Adadevoh family
Columbia Business School alumni